Kamel Fallatah Al-Mor (born 31 March 1983) is a Saudi professional footballer who currently plays as a right-back .

Club career

Early life
Kamel was born in Mecca, Saudi Arabia in 1983, the age of eighteen he played Al-Wahda (Mecca) club.

Al-Ahli
In May 2010, Kamel signed with Al-Ahli for 7.000.000 SR, and has become a staple with the club. In the 2011–12 season, Kamel helped Al-Ahli to a second-place finish. He made 40 appearances and scored a goal.

Honours

Club
Al-Ahli
Saudi Champions Cup: 2011, 2012

Al-Nassr
Saudi Crown Prince Cup: 2013-14
Saudi Professional League: 2013-14, 2014-15

Al-Wehda
Prince Mohammad bin Salman League: 2017-18

References

1986 births
Living people
Al-Wehda Club (Mecca) players
Al-Ahli Saudi FC players
Al Nassr FC players
Al-Taawoun FC players
Jeddah Club players
Al-Ansar FC (Medina) players
Al-Entesar Club players
Saudi Professional League players
Saudi First Division League players
Saudi Second Division players
Association football defenders
Saudi Arabian footballers
Saudi Arabia international footballers